Abdelmahid Laghouati (25 December 1943 – 11 August 2021) was an Algerian poet.

Biography

Bibliography
Poèmes indigènes
Comme toujours (1977)
L'Oued noir (1980)
De si belles insultes (1982)
Bouches d’incendie (1983)
Où est passé le grand troupeau ? (1988)
Gerçures (1994)
Poèmes (1998)
Errances (2000)
Entre sursaut et plénitude (2007)

Anthologies
Anthologie de la nouvelle poésie algérienne (1971)
Des Chèvres noires dans un champ de neige ? 30 poètes et 4 peintres algériens (2003)
Encyclopédie de la poésie algérienne de langue française, 1930-2008 (2009)

References

1943 births
2021 deaths
Algerian male poets
People from Berrouaghia
20th-century Algerian poets
20th-century male writers
21st-century Algerian poets
21st-century male writers